Highway 225 is a highway in the Canadian province of Saskatchewan. It runs from Highway 312 to Highway 2 near Domremy.

Highway 225 also passes near Batoche and St. Isidore-de-Bellevue. The Batoche National Historic Site is also accessible.

References

225